Laurent Lucchese (born 4 April 1973) is a French former professional rugby league footballer who played as a fullback for Huddersfield, Sheffield Eagles and Paris Saint-Germain. He also represented France at international level.

External links
Statistics at rugbyleagueproject.org

1973 births
Living people
Rugby league fullbacks
French rugby league players
France national rugby league team players
Huddersfield Giants players
Paris Saint-Germain Rugby League players
Sheffield Eagles (1984) players